BNK48 is a Thai idol group and the third international sister group of the Japanese idol group AKB48, based in Bangkok, Thailand.

The original members of the group were recruited in mid-2016 and were announced in early 2017, comprising a total of 30 people. The second-generation 27 additional members were announced on 29 April 2018. On 9 August 2020, 19 third-generation members were announced. On 30 October 2022, 11 fourth-generation members were announced. Some members have left the group in the process known as graduation. , the group consists of 44 members, of whom 15 constitute Team BIII, 15 constitute Team NV, and the rest is categorised as trainees.

The first and current captain of the group is Cherprang, who also serving as shihainin (manager).



Team BIII 

The first formation of Team BIII (read B Three) was announced on 24 December 2017, originally consisting of 24 members, with Pun as captain and Jennis as vice captain. There was also a team shuffle announcement on 16 November 2019, which moved some members to Team NV and some trainees were promoted to Team BIII. After Pun and Jennis left the group, Hoop and Miori are serving as the team captain and vice-captain respectively.

After graduation of some members and team shuffling, the team now consists of 15 members as follows:

Team NV 
Team NV (read N five) formation was announced during Pun's birthday stage on 16 November 2019. Initially, Tarwaan was the team captain while Pupe was vice captain. The current team captain and vice-captain are Nine and Popper respectively.

The team now consists of 15 members as follows:

Trainees 

The members that are not promoted to any team are categorised as trainees ( kenkyūsei). There are now 14 trainees as follows:

Former members 

Like its sister group, the leaving of the group is known as graduation. The graduated members are as follows:

Membership timeline

References 

BNK48
 
BNK48